The 2011–12 Tunisian Ligue Professionnelle 1 (Tunisian Professional League)  season was the 86th season of top-tier football in Tunisia. The competition began on 4 November 2011, and ended on 30 September 2012. The defending champions from the previous season are Espérance de Tunis.

This is the first full season held after the Tunisian Revolution.

Team movements

Teams promoted from CPL-2

US Monastir
ES Beni-Khalled

Teams and venues

Results

League table

Result table

Leaders

Top goalscorers

References

Television rights
The Communication bureau of the FTF attributed the broadcasting rights of the Tunisian Ligue Professionnelle 1 to ERTT (Tunisian Radio and Television Establishment with its two channels Tunis7 and Tunisie 21).

External links
 2011–12 Ligue 1 on RSSSF.com

Tun
Tunisian Ligue Professionnelle 1 seasons
1